The ice dance competition in figure skating at the 2022 Winter Olympics was held on 12 February (rhythm dance) and 14 February (free dance), at the Capital Indoor Stadium in Haidian District of Beijing. Gabriella Papadakis / Guillaume Cizeron of France won the event. Victoria Sinitsina / Nikita Katsalapov, representing the Russian Olympic Committee, won the silver medal, and Madison Hubbell / Zachary Donohue from the United States bronze.

Summary
The 2018 champions Tessa Virtue / Scott Moir and bronze medalists Maia Shibutani / Alex Shibutani retired from competition.  The silver medalists, Papadakis / Cizeron, had the highest score of the 2021–22 season before the Olympics. Victoria Sinitsina / Nikita Katsalapov had the second-highest score of the season and are the 2021 World champions, where Papadakis/Cizeron did not compete. In ice dance, the possibility of major error is small, and the scores at the Olympics are typically consistent with the scores throughout the Olympic season; as a result, Papadakis/Cizeron and Sinitsina/Katsalapov were considered the main gold contenders, with Papadakis/Cizeron the favorites.

Papadakis/Cizeron broke their own world record in the rhythm dance to take a two-point lead over Sinitsina/Katsalapov into the free dance, which Papadakis/Cizeron then won by 5 points and narrowly missed breaking their own world record. Their combined total score was a new world record and they won the gold medal by 6.5 points ahead of Sinitsina/Katsalapov. Hubbell/Donohue were third in both segments to win the bronze medal by 4 points ahead of their American teammates Madison Chock / Evan Bates.

Records

Prior to the competition, the existing ISU best scores were:

The following new best scores were set during this competition:

Qualification

Results

Rhythm dance
The rhythm dance competition was held on 12 February.

Free dance
The free dance competition was held on 14 February.

Overall
The skaters were ranked according to their total combined (overall) score.

References

Figure skating at the 2022 Winter Olympics
Mixed events at the 2022 Winter Olympics